Khao Wong is a district (amphoe) in the eastern part of Kalasin province, northeastern Thailand.

Geography
Neighboring districts are (from the south clockwise) Kuchinarai and Na Khu of Kalasin Province, Dong Luang and Khamcha-i of Mukdahan province.

History
The minor district (king amphoe) was created on 1 June 1969, when the five tambons Khum Kao, Song Plueai, Na Khu, Phu Laen Chang, and Nong Phue were split off from Kuchinarai district. It was upgraded to a full district on 1 April 1974.

Administration
The district is divided into six subdistricts (tambons), which are further subdivided into 59 villages (mubans). Kut Sim is a township (thesaban tambon) which covers parts of tambons Khum Kao, Kut Sim Khum Mai, and tambon Kut Pla Khao. There are a further five tambon administrative organizations (TAO).

Missing numbers are tambons which now form Na Khu District.

References

External links
amphoe.com

Khao Wong